Neocollyris plicicollis is a species of ground beetle in the genus Neocollyris in the family Carabidae. It was described by Horn in 1901.

References

Plicicollis, Neocollyris
Beetles described in 1901